Jeff "JJ" Janiak (born November 4, 1976) is an American/British singer and songwriter best known as the lead vocalist of hardcore punk band Discharge. He was also the vocalist for Broken Bones, Dead Heros and Wasted Life. Janiak has contributed to various other musical projects and has toured internationally. His vocal style has been described as shouting, harsh and guttural.

Life and career 
Jeff Janiak was born in Livingston, New Jersey on November 4, 1976, and spent the first years of his life in Irvington, New Jersey until moving to Toms River, New Jersey in the late 1970s. Janiak is a relative of the actor William Campbell. Janiak had a major interest in horror films and occult books during his youth. Janiak described himself to Metal Transistor as "a strange kid that felt like he couldn't fit in anywhere".

Janiak started skateboarding at a young age, and eventually would start skating competitively winning numerous competitions which would land him a sponsorship. Janiak was then recruited by local pro skateboarder Jeff Jones to ride for his demo team, which would see Janiak doing skate demos around the tri-state area.

His introduction to music started when he began listening to his parents records and his mother gave him her copy of The Monster Mash. By the age of ten, Janiak was introduced to punk rock music through skateboarding, then later hearing the Dead Kennedys Plastic Surgery Disasters album which ultimately gained his attention to the genre. At the age of 13, Janiak attended his first punk rock gig watching Ramones at City Gardens in Trenton, New Jersey.

Janiak's introduction to playing music began at the age of 12 when he taught himself how to play the drums, than at the age of 14, he started his first band Chaotic Discharge. Janiak attended Toms River High School East, then at age 17 he dropped out of high school than went missing. Janiak went to Philadelphia for a short period, and was staying in a squat. He briefly returned to New Jersey, only to play his final gig with Chaotic Discharge at The Stone Pony. After the gig, Janiak hitched a ride to the Lower East Side of Manhattan where he had got involved in the anarcho punk scene and ended up squatting in an abandoned community building until it was shut down by the NYPD. After the squat was shut, Janiak spent the remainder of his time in New York City living in and around Tompkins Square Park. During this time, he developed a drug addiction which would last from his late teens to his mid twenties. His whereabouts were discovered when he was seen on a news report about the anniversary of the 1988 Tompkins Square Park riot. Multiple photos of Janiak began to emerge in various publications about punk rock, anarchy and fashion from during his time living in New York.

At age 21, Janiak was arrested and charged with drug possession. He served time at the Garden State Youth Correctional Facility.  Upon his release, Janiak cleaned himself up and started a career in the automotive industry spray painting cars. After an eight year hiatus, Janiak returned to writing and playing music. Janiak made his come back not as a drummer, but as a vocalist. He had joined the band Dead Heros in 2002. In 2003, Janiak recorded his first release with the band at Twain Studios with recording engineer Bob Both and producer Marty Munsch who would teach Janiak the basics of recording production. In 2008, Janiak left Dead Heros. He then left the US and moved to Stoke-on-Trent, England.

In 2009, he attended a local gig and met members of the punk band Wasted Life and soon joined their ranks as vocalist until 2013. In 2012, Janiak joined the punk / crossover thrash band Broken Bones, and in 2014, Janiak was recruited by legendary punk band Discharge. In 2016, Janiak made his vocal debut with Discharge on the End of Days album which was released by Nuclear Blast Records. The album reached number 10 in the Official UK rock charts and number 23 in The Indie Charts. In October 2016, Discharge did a North American tour in support of the album. Upon the bands arrival in Canada, Janiak was detained at customs due to his previous criminal charges and was initially denied entry into the country. It was then decided in Janiak's favor to grant him a temporary visa which would allow him to play their gig in Vancouver, but he had to leave the country the following day.

In 2020, Janiak revealed to Drew Stone on The New York Hardcore Chronicles Live that he had been working on a new music project called False Fed during the corona virus pandemic with Stig Miller of Amebix and Roy Mayorga of Nausea, Soulfly and Stone Sour.

Influence 
Janiak has stated that Jim Morrison of The Doors was the biggest influence on his vocal style.

Discography

Discharge 
Studio albums
 End of Days     (2016)

Singles
 New World Order (2016)

Live albums
Live 2014        (2015)

Music videos
 New World Order (2015)
 Hatebomb        (2016)
 The Broken Law  (2017)

DVD
 Discharge – Legends of Punk Vol. 1 (2019)

Broken Bones 
EPs
 Vigilante   (2013)
 Dead & Gone (2013)

Music videos
 Tread on Me (2014)

Wasted Life 

Studio albums
 Weapons of Self Destruction       (2013)
 It Means Nuthin' When You're Dead (2011)

EPs
 Wasted Life                       (2009)
 The Zombie Sessions               (2018)

Music videos
 Bad Habits                        (2014)
 Why Me ?                          (2013)

Dead Heros 
Singles
 Schizophrenic (2008)
 Dead Heros    (2003)

Live albums
 Live at CBGB's    (2004)

Compilation
 Nothing to Lose

Demos
 2008 Demo
 2002 Demo "Same Story, Different Page"

Chaotic Discharge 
 Demo 94  (1994) – Cassette

Collaborations 

Live

 with Cavalera Conspiracy on "Protest & Survive" and "Hear Nothing See Nothing Say Nothing" at O2 Academy 2, Birmingham, England (2019)
 with Conflict on "The Serenade Is Dead" at Rebellion Festival (2019), at The Underground, Stoke-on-Trent (2018 & 2019)
 with Blitzkrieg on "Conspiracy" at Rebellion Festival (2019)
 with The Take on "It's My Life" at Temple of Boom, Leeds (2019)
 with Vice Squad on "Last Rockers" at The Box, Crewe (2010)

Film and TV appearances 

 Discharge – Legends of Punk Vol. 1 (as himself)                 (2019)
 Rock and Roll (episode 8 "Anger"; Sky Arts documentary)     (2017)
 Rascal - Punk in Belfast. As it WAS, as it IS (documentary)        (2017)
 Waxx (TV mini-series as himself; guest appearance on Ace of Spades)     (2016)
 Oatcakes ! (documentary; as himself)                                 (2014)
 Wasted Land (short film; as thug)                   (2012)

References 

American punk rock musicians
American punk rock singers
British punk rock singers
English punk rock musicians
Punk people
1976 births
Living people
American heavy metal singers
20th-century American singers
21st-century American singers
Punk rock singers
Entertainers from New Jersey
Anarcho-punk musicians
People from Toms River, New Jersey
People from Livingston, New Jersey
Hardcore punk musicians
Music in Stoke-on-Trent
People from Irvington, New Jersey
Singer-songwriters from New Jersey
Toms River High School East alumni
20th-century American male singers
21st-century American male singers
American male singer-songwriters